Genç is a Turkish name, it may refer to:

People
 Aytek Genc (born 1966), Turkish Australian footballer
 Burhan Genç (born 1983), Danish R&B and pop singer
 Kamer Genç (1940–2016), Turkish politician
 Süleyman Genç (1944–2022), Turkish politician

Given name
 Genç Osman Yavaş (born 1971), Turkish rock singer

Places
 Genç, Bingöl, town and district of Bingöl Province in the Eastern Anatolia region of Turkey

See also
 Genç Fenerbahçeliler, fan group of Turkish football team Fenerbahçe

Turkish-language surnames